"Runaway" is the fourth single from the album 7 Years and 50 Days by German trance group Groove Coverage.

Remix List

"Runaway" (Josh Harris Vocal Club Edit) – 3:48	
"Runaway" (Josh Harris Vocal Club Mix) – 7:22	
"Runaway" (Josh Harris Dub) – 6:57	
"Runaway" (Special D Remix) – 6:28	
"Runaway" (Flip & Fill Remix) – 5:23	
"Runaway" (Friday Night Posse Remix) – 7:19	
"Runaway" (DJ Manian Remix) – 6:36	
"Runaway" (Axel Konrad Remix) – 7:10
"Runaway" (Extended Mix) – 5:00	
"Runaway" (U.K. Radio Edit) – 3:08	
"Runaway" (Alternative Radio Mix) – 2:55		
"Runaway" (Acappella) – 3:20

Chart positions

References

Groove Coverage songs
2004 songs
Songs written by Lou Bega